Evitts Creek is an unincorporated community located on the eastern outskirts of Cumberland, Maryland, United States along Maryland Route 51 (West Industrial Boulevard) and immediately east of the confluence of Evitts Creek and the North Branch Potomac River.

References

Unincorporated communities in Allegany County, Maryland
Unincorporated communities in Maryland
Populated places in the Cumberland, MD-WV MSA